107.1 Hope Radio (DXHD 107.1 MHz) is an FM station owned and operated by Adventist Media. Its studios and transmitter are located at Brgy. Camanchiles, Matanao.

References

External links
Hope Radio SPAC FB Page

Radio stations in Davao del Sur
Radio stations established in 2015
Christian radio stations in the Philippines